Bruno Miguel Araújo Morais (born 8 April 1998) is a Portuguese footballer who plays for Montalegre as a defender.

Club career
Morais made his Primeira Liga debut in a 1-0 win over S.C. Braga on 7 December 2019.

References

External links

ZeroZero Profile
CD Aves Profile 

1998 births
Living people
People from Vila Nova de Famalicão
Portuguese footballers
Association football defenders
Primeira Liga players
Segunda Divisão players
Gil Vicente F.C. players
C.D.C. Montalegre players
C.D. Aves players
Segunda División B players
Club Recreativo Granada players
Portuguese expatriate footballers
Portuguese expatriate sportspeople in Spain
Expatriate footballers in Spain
Sportspeople from Braga District